Rajendra Patil (Yadravkar) is a politician from Kolhapur district, Maharashtra who is currently Minister of State in the government of Maharashtra. He was appointed Minister of state for Public Health & Family Welfare, Medical Education, Food & Drug Administration, Textile, Culture Affairs in the Government of Maharashtra. He is current Member of Maharashtra Legislative Assembly from Shirol Vidhan Sabha constituency as an independent member.

Career 
His in depth knowledge in sectors like Sugar Industry, Spinning mills, Banks, Education, Agriculture and Health has helped the financial and material well- being of around 60,000 farmers across 150+ villages in and around Shirol and Hatkalanagle.

At the age of 26 he was elected as corporator of Jaysingpur Municipality. Later at the age of 32 he was appointed Chairman of Sharad Sugar Factory. Under his leadership, Sharad Sugar Factory became debt free in five years. He is known for his leadership skills and strong control over administration.

Rajendra Patil Yadravkar has strong supporter base in Kolhapur and North Karnataka area. His family has been into social service in Shirol and Hatkalanagle since 3 generations.

Patil has founded several educational institutions, such as the Sharad Institute of Technology College of Engineering and the Sharad Institute of Technology, Polytechnic in Yadrav and the Sharad College Of Agriculture in Jainapur.

He also holds positions in various institutions. He is the president of the All India Federation of Co-op Spinning Mills Ltd., is chairman of Yadrav Co-op bank ltd., Sharad Co-op Sugar Factory, Ltd., Shri Shamrao Patil Yadravkar charitable and educational trust, and Parvati Co-op Industrial Estate Ltd.. He is the director of Kolhapur Zilla Co-op Spinning Mills Ltd., the Kolhapur District Central Cooperative Bank and Parvati Co-op Spinning Mills Ltd..

Parvati Co-operative Industrial Estate is one of the largest industrial estates in Asia.

To provide education to children of farmers he founded Engineering and Polytechnic college in Yadrav (Kolhapur).

Within less span his Engineering college - Sharad Institute of Technology (SITCO) and Sharad Institute of Technology, Polytechnic, Yadrav garnered a reputation in Western Maharashtra.

He also founded Sharad College of Agriculture, Jainapur in 2013 to promote research and education in development of Agriculture

Positions held
 2019: Elected to Maharashtra Legislative Assembly
 2019: Appointed Minister of State Government of Maharashtra
 2019: Appointed minister of state for Public Health & Family Welfare, Medical Education, Food & Drug Administration, Textile, Culture Affairs in the Government of Maharashtra

See also
 Uddhav Thackeray ministry

References

External links
  Shivsena Home Page 

Living people
Maharashtra MLAs 2019–2024
Date of birth missing (living people)
State cabinet ministers of Maharashtra
Place of birth missing (living people)
Year of birth missing (living people)
Shiv Sena politicians